Merthyr Road railway station served the village of Hirwaun, in the historical county of Glamorganshire, Wales, from 1851 to 1853 on the Vale of Neath Railway.

History 
The station was opened on 24 September 1851 by the Vale of Neath Railway.

References 

Disused railway stations in Rhondda Cynon Taf
Railway stations in Great Britain opened in 1851
Railway stations in Great Britain closed in 1853
1851 establishments in Wales
1853 disestablishments in Wales